Wrenn Peak is a peak rising to 1750 m on the ridge at the head of Sandy Glacier and Enyo Glacier in Olympus Range, McMurdo Dry Valleys. Named by Advisory Committee on Antarctic Names (US-ACAN) (2004) after John H. Wrenn, Department of Geology, Northern Illinois University, DeKalb, IL, a participant in the McMurdo Dry Valleys Drilling Project, 1973–74.

Mountains of Victoria Land
McMurdo Dry Valleys